Amydrium hainanense is a species of flowering plant in genus Amydrium and arum family, Araceae.

Distribution 
its native range is South China to North Vietnam.

References 

Monsteroideae